Allium savii is a species of wild onion native to southwestern Europe: Balearic Islands, France incl Corsica, Italy (Emilia-Romagna, Toscana, Lazio, Sardinia).

References

savii
Onions
Flora of Europe
Plants described in 1852